Michael Stephen Silk, FBA, is a decorated emeritus professor author and a retired professor of classical and comparative literature at King's College, London. He was elected a member of the British Academy in 2009 and has illustrated 7 works of literature in relation to the theory and practice of tragedy and comedy, Greek poetry and drama, literary theory, and the classical tradition. He was elected a fellow of the British Academy in 1999. 

Born in Birmingham on the 11th June 1941, Michael was born to parent who were Ashkenazi Jews who emigrated Poland, Warsaw 9 years prior to his birth to escape the Holocaust. He lived with his older brother John Silk. He attended King’s Heath High School and then attended Cambridge in 1959 on a scholarship to study Greek Classics, where he then obtained his PhD after 8 years. This is where he met Laurel Silk (a retired podiatrist) - his wife since 1962, who he had children with. He then moved to teaching at King’s College London where he became a tenured professor after teaching for 50 years, now having retired in 2017.  He now a father, grandfather and great-grandfather who lives in Kent and still composes literary pieces. He is also a chess international master.

Selected publications
"Hughes, Plath and Aeschylus: Allusion and Poetic Language", Arion: A Journal of Humanities and the Classics, 14 (3) (2007), pp. 1–33.
Standard Languages and Language Standards – Greek, Past and Present, Ashgate, 2009. Editor with Alexandra Georgakopoulou
 The classical tradition: Art, literature, thought. Wiley-Blackwell, Chichester, 2014. (With Rosemary Barrow and Ingo Gildenhard)

References 

Living people
Academics of King's College London
Fellows of the British Academy
Year of birth missing (living people)
British classical scholars
Fellows of King's College London